Franco Togni (3 November 1960 - 29 December 2016) was an Italian male marathon runner and mountain runner. He won one national championships at senior level (1996 marathon).

Biography
On December 29, 2016, at the age of 56, he died as a result of a mountain accident, near the Valsecca Pass, during the crossing from the Fratelli Calvi refuge to the Baroni al Brunone refuge.

References

External links
 

1960 births
2016 deaths
Italian male mountain runners
Italian male long-distance runners
Italian masters athletes
20th-century Italian people